The Studebaker Sky Hawk was a pillarless two-door hardtop coupe produced by the Studebaker-Packard Corporation for the 1956 model year only. The Sky Hawk was considered part of the Studebaker President series. One of four models of Hawks available that year, the Sky Hawk was positioned between the flagship Golden Hawk and Power Hawk pillared coupe. Sky Hawks differed from Golden Hawks in that they had less chrome trim and lacked the Golden Hawk's fins. They also had slightly less luxurious interiors, and were powered by the President's 289 cubic inch (4.7 L) V-8 with 210 horsepower (157 kW) standard and 225 horsepower (168 kW) optional (rather than the Packard 352 of the Golden Hawk). The Sky Hawk's base price was $2,477 before options, and 3,050 were produced that year. The Sky Hawk was discontinued for the 1957 model year.

References

External links 
 1956 Studebaker Hawk

Studebaker vehicles
Coupés
Cars introduced in 1956